Macroeconomic indicators are aggregated statistics for a geography, population, or political jurisdiction gathered by agencies and bureaus of various government statistical organization, and sometimes by private organizations using similar techniques.

List of macroeconomic indicators 

 Aggregate demand
 Aggregate supply
 External debt indicators
 GDP deflator
 Green gross domestic product
 Gross domestic product
 Gross national product
 Gross National Happiness
 Jobless claims
 Monetary conditions index
 Net foreign assets
 Nominal GDP
 Nonfarm payrolls
 Real gross domestic product
 Social Progress Index

See also
 :Category:Macroeconomic indicators
 Economic indicators

References

Macroeconomic indicators